Hypodermyasis is a parasitic infection by the larvae of warble flies, most notably Hypoderma lineatum and Hypoderma bovis. These flies mostly infect cattle in the warmer areas of the northern hemisphere. Humans become hosts when they inadvertently swallow the eggs of those flies.


Symptoms
The symptoms of this infection depends on where the larvae migrates into the body when swallowed, however the most common symptoms are :
 Swelling
 Symptoms resembling those of an allergic reaction
 Skin eruptions
 Eye and neurological symptoms.

Treatment
The infection is usually treated with ivermectin.

References

Arthropod infestations